The BBC News at Five was an hour-long daily news programme broadcast at 5:00pm on BBC News. The programme was fronted by Huw Edwards, the BBC's lead presenter for major breaking news.  The show includes a detailed look at the news, as well as analysis with guests and sport and weather updates.

The programme was placed on an indefinite hiatus as a result of the COVID-19 pandemic. The final edition of the BBC News at Five was broadcast on 13 March 2020.

History
The programme started on 3 April 2006 as part of the BBC's relaunch of BBC News presenters, which saw the introduction of the new flagship programme to compete against Jeremy Thompson's Live at Five programme on rival channel Sky News, and to improve BBC News ratings for the hour.

As part of the 2008 revamp of the entire news output, the show moved studios within BBC Television Centre along with BBC News and the BBC News at One and BBC News at Ten bulletins. The show originally broadcast from Studio N8 but moved to Studio N6.

On 18 March 2013, the programme moved to Broadcasting House along with BBC News and the BBC One bulletins. Unlike most other BBC News Channel bulletins, the BBC News at Five was presented from Studio C, which was usually the main studio for BBC World News.

On 4 November 2013, the BBC News at Five received new opening titles featuring the hour of broadcast.

On 13 March 2020, the last edition of the 'BBC News at Five was broadcast until further notice in light of the COVID-19 pandemic. The UK Government's daily press conference on the pandemic was broadcast in place of BBC News at Five on BBC One and the BBC News Channel.

Outside broadcasts
As well as presenting from the studio, the main presenters were called upon to present on location when major stories broke. For example, Huw Edwards presented live from the BBC's Washington Studio for the 2008, 2012 and 2016 US Presidential Elections and presented live from Basra from the withdrawal ceremony. George Alagiah presented from L'Aquila in April 2009 and Haiti in January 2010 when earthquakes struck the countries. During the 2015 Election campaign Edwards presented from across the UK, while Gavin Esler was based in Edinburgh and Clive Myrie served as the London presenter.

Presenters

If there is no position before the years of being a presenter, then this newsreader was either a relief presenter or occasional guest stand-in presenter.

 Huw Edwards (Main presenter, 2006–2020)
 Gavin Esler (Deputy presenter, 2006–2017)
 Jane Hill (Deputy presenter, 2017–2020)
 Ben Brown (2006–2020)
 Louise Minchin (2006–2011)
 Peter Sissons (2006–2009)
 Julian Worricker (2006–2020)
 Emily Maitlis (2007–2016)
 Nicholas Owen (2008–2017)
 Tim Willcox (2008–2015)
 Joanna Gosling (2009–2010)
 Jon Sopel (2009–2012)
 Clive Myrie (2010–2020)
 Zeinab Badawi (2011)
 Sophie Long (2011–2012)
 Annita McVeigh (2013–2017)
 Matthew Price (2015)
 Maxine Mawhinney (2015–2016)
 Simon McCoy (2015–2019)
 Christian Fraser (2016–2020)
 Reeta Chakrabarti (2017–2020)
 Shaun Ley (2017–2020)
 Martine Croxall (2018–2020)
 Carrie Gracie (2018–2020)
 Rebecca Jones (2018–2020)
 Carole Walker (2018–2019)

Format
Generally the programme followed a standard format as follows –

 5:00pm – Headlines
 5:00pm to 5:15pm – Stories
 5:15pm – Headlines
 5:15pm to 5:25pm – Interview, in-depth analysis
 5:25pm to 5:30pm – Weather
 5:30pm – Headlines
 5:30pm to 5:45pm – Stories with sports round-up (except on Friday)
 5:45pm – Headlines (except on Friday for a look ahead to Sportsday)
 5:45pm to 5:55pm – Interview, in-depth analysis (except on Friday for The Film Review)
 5:55pm to 6:00pm – Weather

The weather updates were generally presented from the screen away from the main desk. Sports updates were presented from the BBC Sport Centre at MediaCityUK, Salford. The Film Review appeared during the programme on Fridays between 5:45pm and 6:00pm, and is presented by the anchor and a film critic, usually Mark Kermode, from the main desk, however the background and lighting changes to resemble a cinema effect. It features reviews of all the week's main releases.

References

External links
 

2006 British television series debuts
2010s British television series
BBC television news shows
BBC New Media